The 2015 Redcar and Cleveland Borough Council election took place on 7 May 2015 to elect members of Redcar and Cleveland Borough Council in England. This was on the same day as other local elections, as well as the 2015 General Election. One major change was that Council Leader George Dunning and many other Labour councillors resigned from the party or were deselected and ran as independent candidates. The election saw the council return to no overall control.

Background
The 2015 Redcar and Cleveland Borough Council election was held on the same day as other local elections as well as the 2015 General Election.

The Liberal Democrats, who had made gains in the 2011 election, as well as MP Ian Swales in 2010, lost seats in lieu of the Conservatives, UKIP & Multiple independents.

The Labour Party lost several seats, as well as the overall control they had between 2011 and 2013. 

UKIP got its first seat on the council as Steve Turner was elected to the borough council, however he would leave the party in 2017, and was elected as Cleveland Police and Crime Comissioner in 2021.

Election Result

Ward Results

Brotton

References

2015 English local elections
May 2015 events in the United Kingdom
2015
2010s in North Yorkshire